HMS Irwell was a  of the Royal Navy intended to serve in World War I. She was originally named HMS Bridlington, being renamed HMS Goole in 1918 before being launched on 12 August 1919. She was not completed until April 1926, when she was assigned to the Royal Naval Volunteer Reserve as a drillship. She was renamed again to Irwell in September 1926. She arrived at Lacmotts in Liverpool for breaking up on 27 November 1962.

See also
 Goole, Yorkshire, her original namesake when she was launched

References

 

Hunt-class minesweepers (1916)
1919 ships